A French passport is an identity document issued to French citizens. Besides enabling the bearer to travel internationally and serving as indication of French citizenship (but not proof; the possession of a French passport only establishes the presumption of French citizenship according to French law), the passport facilitates the process of securing assistance from French consular officials abroad or other European Union member states in case a French consular is absent, if needed.

Every French citizen is also a citizen of the European Union. The passport, along with the national identity card allows for rights of free movement and residence in any of the states of the European Union, European Economic Area and Switzerland.

History
The history of the French passport can be traced to documents issued in the 19th century.

Types
Passports are valid for 10 years for applicants aged 18 or over and 5 years for applicants under the age of 18. Optical passports (older) have no sign under the word "Passeport" on the front page. Electronic passport contains an embedded chip and has the chip logo under the word "Passeport". Biometric passeports are the most recent ones and are decorated as the electronic passports but the word "Passeport" is underlined.

Physical appearance

Front cover

Unlike those from most other EU countries which are burgundy, ordinary passports have a Bordeaux-red front cover, with the diplomatic emblem of France emblazoned in the centre of the front cover. The word "PASSEPORT" (Passport) is inscribed below the emblem and "Union européenne" (European Union), "République française" (French Republic) above. The "e-passport" cover has a microchip symbol at the bottom. On the biometric variant of e-passports, the word "PASSEPORT" is underlined. French passports use the standard EU design, with the standard passport containing 32 pages.

Identity information page

The biodata page includes the following data:

 Photo of Passport Holder
 Type (P)
 Code (FRA)
 Passport No.
 Surname 
 Given Names 
 Nationality (Française)
 Date of Birth
 Sex M
 Place of Birth FRANCE
 Date of Issue 
 Date of Expiry 
 Authority 
 Holder's Signature 
 Height 
 Colour of Eyes 
 Residence Page 36

The information page ends with the Machine Readable Zone starting with P<FRA.

Languages
The data page is printed in French and English with translation of the fields on the bearer's page in the other languages of the European Union elsewhere in the document.

Visa free travel

Visa requirements for French citizens are administrative entry restrictions by the authorities of other states placed on citizens of France. As of 21 September 2022, French citizens had visa-free or visa on arrival access to 187 countries and territories, ranking the French passport 6th in the world in terms of travel freedom (tied with the passports of Ireland, Portugal, and the United Kingdom) according to the Henley Passport Index.

French citizens can live and work in any country within the EU as a result of the right of free movement and residence granted in Article 21 of the EU Treaty.

See also
 Passports of the European Union
 Visa policy of the Schengen Area
 Visa requirements for French citizens

References

External links

France
Government of France
European Union passports